KDZN (96.5 FM) is a country formatted broadcast radio station licensed to Glendive, Montana, serving East Central Montana.  KDZN is owned and operated by The Marks Group.

History
KDZN signed on in 1969 as KIVE. In 1985, the station became KGLE-FM; at the time, it was owned by crosstown Friends of Christian Radio, Inc, who still own KGLE AM 590.  In 1986, Magic Air Communications bought KGLE-FM, switching the calls to KDZN and the format to country, where it remains today. Stephen Marks, through Glendive Broadcasting Corporation, bought Magic Air in 1995, making KDZN a sister station to KXGN AM-TV, which Marks had purchased in 1990.

Programming
Programming on KDZN is provided via the Westwood One satellite network during the mid-morning, mid-afternoon and evening hours.  News on KDZN comes from CBS.

References

External links 
 Z-96 Online

DZN
Dawson County, Montana
Country radio stations in the United States
Radio stations established in 1969
1969 establishments in Montana